"Agora" is a song by American experimental rock band Bear Hands. The song was released in early 2014 as the second single from the band's second album, Distraction, and peaked at number 17 on the Billboard Alternative Songs chart.

Commercial performance
The song was the second song by the band to chart, reaching number 17 on the Billboard Alternative Songs chart.

Charts

Release history

References

2014 songs
2014 singles
Cantora Records singles
Bear Hands songs